The 2015 US Open was a tennis tournament played on outdoor hard courts. It was the 135th edition of the US Open, the fourth and final Grand Slam event of the year. It took place at the USTA Billie Jean King National Tennis Center.

Marin Čilić was the defending champion in the men's singles event, but lost to eventual champion Novak Djokovic in the semifinals. Serena Williams was the three-time defending champion in the women's singles event and was also trying to complete the calendar Grand Slam since Steffi Graf in 1988, having won the Australian Open, French Open and Wimbledon, but lost to Roberta Vinci in the semifinals. Flavia Pennetta won the women's singles title and became the first Italian to win the US Open. The finalists Vinci and Flavia Pennetta were childhood friends from Southern Italy and grew up together.

Tournament

The 2015 US Open was the 135th edition of the tournament and it was held at the USTA Billie Jean King National Tennis Center in Flushing Meadows–Corona Park of Queens in New York City, New York, United States.

The tournament was an event run by the International Tennis Federation (ITF) and is part of the 2015 ATP World Tour and the 2015 WTA Tour calendars under the Grand Slam category. The tournament consists of both men's and women's singles and doubles draws as well as a mixed doubles event. There are singles and doubles events for both boys and girls (players under 18), which is part of the Grade A category of tournaments, and singles, doubles and quad events for men's and women's wheelchair tennis players as part of the NEC tour under the Grand Slam category.

In addition, the annual men's and women's Champions Invitational doubles events were held, with eight male and eight female former Grand Slam champions taking part. For the second year running, the American Collegiate Invitational competitions is organized, where top sixteen American collegiate players compete in men's and women's singles events. Exhibition matches also take place.

The tournament is played on hard courts and takes place over a series of 17 courts with DecoTurf surface, including the three main showcourts – Arthur Ashe Stadium (with permanent steel erected and new video boards, LED court lighting and sound system in place, as part of a refurbishment project), Louis Armstrong Stadium and Grandstand. It is the last ever US Open played on courts without the operational roof on centre court and with the old Grandstand in place. Starting from the 2016 edition, the Arthur Ashe Stadium will have completed retractable roof and matches will be played on newly built Grandstand.

After two years of tournament being scheduled across 15 days, the US Open returns to a traditional 14-day schedule in 2015, which has impact on all senior events. Women's singles semifinals have been scheduled for September 10 evening session, while men's singles semifinal matches will be played on Friday September 11 after mixed doubles final. Men's doubles final will be played before women's singles final on Saturday September 12, and men's singles final will follow women's doubles final.

Because Serena Williams could become the first woman to win all four major tennis titles in a calendar year since Steffi Graf accomplished the feat in 1988 and because she could tie Graf's major title count of 22, the women's final sold out before the men's final for the first time.

Broadcast
In the United States, the 2015 US Open was the first under a new, 11-year, $825 million contract with ESPN, in which the broadcaster holds exclusive rights to the entire tournament and the US Open Series, thus ending CBS Sports' 46-year association with the tournament, and availability of coverage on broadcast television. This also made ESPN the exclusive U.S. broadcaster for three of the four tennis majors (the French Open is split between Tennis Channel for cable coverage and NBC for over-the-air coverage, with portions previously sub-licensed to ESPN until 2016).

Point and prize money distribution

Point distribution
Below is a series of tables for each of the competitions showing the ranking points on offer for each event.

Senior

Wheelchair

Junior

Prize money
The US Open total prize money for 2015 was increased by 10.5 percent to a record $42,253,400, which potentially could reach almost 45 million dollars, as the top three finishers in the Emirates Airline US Open Series may earn up an additional $2.625 million in bonus money at the US Open.

Of the total prize money, $33,017,800 (plus $1,760,000 in qualifying competitions) is distributed for singles players, $4,927,600 for teams competing in doubles events and $500,000 for mixed doubles teams. Competitors in Legends Exhibition, Wheelchair and Champions Invitational events earn $570,000 while players' per diem is estimated at $1,478,000.

 Bonus prize money
Top three players in the 2015 US Open Series receive bonus prize money, depending on where they finished in the 2015 US Open, according to money schedule below.

Singles players
2015 US Open – Men's singles

2015 US Open – Women's singles

Day-by-day summaries

Before the tournament
Maria Sharapova, the 2006 champion, ranked third in the world (formerly first), withdrew from the tournament due to a leg injury the day before tournament began. Making her withdrawal that was for the second time in three years.

Day 4
British qualifier Johanna Konta upset the 9th seeded Garbiñe Muguruza won in three sets at 7–6(7–4), 6–7(4–7), 6–2 on an epic longest match at three hours and twenty-three minutes, surpassing Nadia Petrova–Samantha Stosur match in the 2011 US Open.

Day 6
Eugenie Bouchard announced that she is withdrawing from the tournament citing a concussion days before her scheduled fourth round match with 43rd-ranked Roberta Vinci. She also withdrew from Women's Doubles and Mixed Doubles. Due to a withdrawal issue, Vinci advanced to her US Open quarterfinal in four years.

Day 8
Kevin Anderson, the 15th seed, upset the 3rd seeded Andy Murray in the fourth round on a four setter win. This was the first time since 2010 US Open that Murray failed to reach his Slam quarterfinal. Anderson became the first South African to reach a Slam quarterfinal since Wayne Ferreira at the 2003 Australian Open.

Day 9 and 10
In the women's quarterfinals, Kristina Mladenovic, Petra Kvitová and Simona Halep reached in their first US Open quarterfinal. For Mladenovic, it was her first Grand Slam singles quarterfinal overall six years after her first Slam debut.

Day 11
The women's semifinals was scheduled to be on September 10 but was cancelled due to a rain.

Day 12
Roberta Vinci defeated Women's No. 1 and 3-time defending champion Serena Williams in three sets. This loss ended Williams' bid to win a calendar-year Grand Slam.

Day 13
In the women's final, the two players were Italian: Vinci and Flavia Pennetta. This was the first time this happened in the Open Era.

Events

Men's singles

 Novak Djokovic def.  Roger Federer, 6–4, 5–7, 6–4, 6–4

Women's singles

  Flavia Pennetta def.  Roberta Vinci, 7–6(7–4), 6–2

Men's doubles

  Pierre-Hugues Herbert /  Nicolas Mahut def.  Jamie Murray /  John Peers, 6–4, 6–4

Women's doubles

  Martina Hingis /  Sania Mirza def.  Casey Dellacqua /  Yaroslava Shvedova, 6–3, 6–3

Mixed doubles

  Martina Hingis /  Leander Paes def.  Bethanie Mattek-Sands /  Sam Querrey, 6–4, 3–6, [10–7]

Junior boys' singles

  Taylor Harry Fritz def.  Tommy Paul, 6–2, 6–7(4–7), 6–2

Junior girls' singles

  Dalma Gálfi def.  Sofia Kenin, 7–5, 6–4

Junior boys' doubles

  Félix Auger-Aliassime /  Denis Shapovalov def.  Brandon Holt /  Riley Smith, 7–5, 7–6(7–3)

Junior girls' doubles

  Viktória Kužmová /  Aleksandra Pospelova def.  Anna Kalinskaya /  Anastasia Potapova, 7–5, 6–2

Men's champions doubles

  Pat Cash /  Mark Philippoussis def.  Michael Chang /  Todd Martin, 6–2, 6–1

Women's champions doubles

  Lindsay Davenport /  Mary Joe Fernández vs  Tracy Austin /  Gigi Fernández, not played

Wheelchair men's singles

  Shingo Kunieda def.  Stéphane Houdet, 6–7(4–7), 6–3, 6–2

Wheelchair women's singles

  Jordanne Whiley def.  Yui Kamiji, 6–4, 0–6, 6–1

Wheelchair quad singles

  Dylan Alcott def.  David Wagner, 6–1, 4–6, 7–5

Wheelchair men's doubles

  Stéphane Houdet /  Gordon Reid def.  Michaël Jeremiasz /  Nicolas Peifer, 6–3, 6–1

Wheelchair women's doubles

  Jiske Griffioen /  Aniek van Koot def.  Marjolein Buis /  Sabine Ellerbrock,  7–6(7–3),  6–1

Wheelchair quad doubles

  Nick Taylor /  David Wagner def.  Dylan Alcott /  Andrew Lapthorne, 4–6, 6–2, [10–7]

Singles seeds
Seedings are based on rankings as of August 24, 2015. Rankings and points before are as of August 31, 2015.

Because the tournament takes place one week later than in 2014, points defending includes results from both the 2014 US Open and tournaments from the week of 8 September 2014 (Davis Cup for the men; Hong Kong, Québec, and Tashkent for the women).

Men's singles

Women's singles

Doubles seeds

Men's doubles

 1 Rankings are as of 24 August 2015.

Women's doubles

 1 Rankings are as of 24 August 2015.

Mixed doubles

 1 Rankings are as of 24 August 2015.

Wild card entries
The following players received wild cards into the main draw senior events.

Men's singles
  Jared Donaldson
  Bjorn Fratangelo 
  Ryan Harrison
  Pierre-Hugues Herbert
  Lleyton Hewitt
  Austin Krajicek
  Ryan Shane 
  Frances Tiafoe

Women's singles
  Louisa Chirico
  Samantha Crawford 
  Océane Dodin
  Nicole Gibbs
  Sofia Kenin 
  Jamie Loeb 
  Bethanie Mattek-Sands
  Sachia Vickery

Men's doubles
  Deiton Baughman /  Tommy Paul
  Bjorn Fratangelo /  Dennis Novikov
  Taylor Harry Fritz /  Reilly Opelka 
  Sam Groth /  Lleyton Hewitt
  Denis Kudla /  Tim Smyczek
  Julio Peralta /  Matt Seeberger 
  Michael Russell /  Donald Young

Women's doubles
  Tornado Alicia Black /  Ingrid Neel
  Kaitlyn Christian /  Sabrina Santamaria
  Irina Falconi /  Anna Tatishvili
  Nicole Gibbs /  Taylor Townsend
  Maya Jansen /  Erin Routliffe 
  Asia Muhammad /  Maria Sanchez
  Melanie Oudin /  Jessica Pegula

Mixed doubles
  Jennifer Brady /  Mitchell Krueger
  Lauren Davis /  Eric Butorac
  Victoria Duval /  Christian Harrison
  Claire Liu /  Taylor Harry Fritz
  Christina McHale /  Stefan Kozlov
  Anda Perianu /  Andrei Dăescu 
  Taylor Townsend /  Donald Young
  Sachia Vickery /  Frances Tiafoe

Qualifier entries
The qualifying competitions took place at USTA Billie Jean King National Tennis Center on 25 – 28 August 2015.

Junior boys' singles

  Paul-Henri Mathieu
  Alexander Zverev
  Guido Pella
  Michael Berrer
  Nikoloz Basilashvili
  Yoshihito Nishioka
  Jürgen Melzer
  Matthew Ebden
  Evgeny Donskoy
  Andrey Rublev
  Tommy Paul
  John-Patrick Smith
  Elias Ymer
  Konstantin Kravchuk
  Alejandro González
  Illya Marchenko

Junior girls' singles

  Jessica Pegula
  Tereza Mrdeža
  Johanna Konta
  Maria Sakkari
  Anett Kontaveit
  Kateryna Bondarenko
  Elizaveta Kulichkova
  Kiki Bertens
  Alexandra Panova
  Kateryna Kozlova
  Jeļena Ostapenko
  Laura Siegemund
  Mayo Hibi
  Aliaksandra Sasnovich
  Shelby Rogers
  Anna Tatishvili
 Lucky losers
  Daria Kasatkina

Protected ranking
The following players were accepted directly into the main draw using a protected ranking:

Men's Singles
  Mardy Fish (PR 25)
  Tommy Haas (PR 25)
  Florian Mayer (PR 34)
  Radek Štěpánek (PR 57)
  Janko Tipsarević (PR 39)

Women's Singles
  Petra Cetkovská (PR 54)
  Vania King (PR 73)
  Laura Robson (PR 52)

Withdrawals
The following players were accepted directly into the main tournament, but withdrew with injuries.

 Men's singles
Before the tournament
  Julien Benneteau → replaced by  Damir Džumhur
  Juan Mónaco → replaced by  Radu Albot

 Women's singles
Before the tournament
  Alisa Kleybanova → replaced by  Wang Qiang
  Peng Shuai → replaced by  Kirsten Flipkens
  Maria Sharapova → replaced by  Daria Kasatkina

During the tournament
  Eugenie Bouchard

Retirements

 Men's singles
  Pablo Andújar
  Marcos Baghdatis
  Alexandr Dolgopolov
  David Goffin
  Ernests Gulbis
  Denis Istomin
  Thanasi Kokkinakis
  Lu Yen-hsun
  Florian Mayer
  Gaël Monfils
  Aleksandr Nedovyesov
  Jack Sock
  Radek Štěpánek
  Jiří Veselý

 Women's singles
  Vitalia Diatchenko
  Marina Erakovic

See also
US Open (tennis)

Notes

References

External links
Official website

 
US Open
US Open
US Open
2015
US Open
US Open
US Open
US Open